Marquis de Sade were a French post-punk band, active between 1977 and 1981. In their time, the group produced two studio albums, 1979's Dantzig Twist and 1981's Rue de Siam.

Background 

AllMusic describe the band's sound as "witty, dark and exciting music comparable to Howard Devoto's Magazine, mixing post-punk and new wave with a drop of funk to produce an intensely nervous, modern, yet romantic sound, often copied but rarely equaled." Billboard called the band's two albums "highly influential".

Discography 
 Studio albums

 Dantzig Twist (1979)
 Rue de Siam (1981)

 Singles

 "Conrad Veidt" (1978)
 "Air Tight Cell" (1978)
 "Rhythmiques" (1980)
 "Wanda's Loving Boy" (1981)

References

External links 

 

French post-punk music groups
French rock music groups
Pathé-Marconi artists
Breton musical groups